NADECO may stand for: 

 National Democratic Convention (South Africa)
 National Democratic Coalition, Nigeria